Mārtiņš Brauns (17 September 1951 – 24 November 2021) was a Latvian composer and musician. He composed multiple pieces, most notable of which is Saule, Pērkons, Daugava, a choir song regularly performed at the Latvian Song and Dance Festival.

Career 

Brauns studied at the Emīls Dārziņš Music School from 1958 to 1970, studying piano and choir, before moving on to study conducting and music theory after his voice started changing. He then studied at the Jāzeps Vītols Latvian Academy of Music between 1970 and 1976.

From 1975 to 1986, he led the rock band . From 1986 and until his death, Brauns was a member of the Latvian Filmmakers Union and has composed music for various films.

In addition to film scores, Brauns wrote and composed multiple pieces for various theatre plays. His most famous piece, written in the late 1980's for the Valmiera Drama Theatre, titled Saule, Pērkons, Daugava, of which the lyrics are based on the poem Daugava by Latvian poet Rainis; this song has been performed regularly at the Latvian Song and Dance Festival since 1990, and is even considered the unofficial anthem of the festival.
In 2014, an adapted version of the song with lyrics by Catalan poet Miquel Martí i Pol became the official anthem of the Catalan independence movement.

Death 
Brauns was recovering from a heart attack at a hospital when he contracted COVID-19. He died on 24 November 2021, at the age of 70.

Awards 
The album also won a Grawemeyer Award in a world music competition for works composed between 2001 and 2004.

On 3 May 2018, Brauns was made Officer of the Order of the Three Stars, the highest civilian order in Latvia.

In 2019, Brauns received the Golden Microphone Lifetime Contribution Award for his work to enhance Latvian culture.

References

External links 
 Biography at the Latvian Music Information Centre (in English)
 
 

1951 births
2021 deaths
Latvian composers
Latvian Academy of Music alumni
Musicians from Riga
Deaths from the COVID-19 pandemic in Latvia